The 1922 association football match between New Zealand and Australia was not only the first international match for both sides, but the first international held in Oceania. New Zealand won 3–1, initiating a long-time rivalry between both teams, that have met more than 60 times since that first encounter.

Match details

See also
 Australia–New Zealand soccer rivalry
 History of the Australia national soccer team
 History of the New Zealand national football team
 1872 Scotland v England football match

References

International association football matches
Australia national soccer team matches
New Zealand national football team matches
June 1922 sports events